Earl John Robinson (November 3, 1936 – July 4, 2014) was an American professional baseball outfielder and third baseman who played in Major League Baseball (MLB) for the Los Angeles Dodgers and Baltimore Orioles. He attended the University of California, Berkeley, where he played both baseball and basketball, helping  Cal to three straight conference titles in basketball from 1956 to 1958. Born in New Orleans, Robinson attended Berkeley High School in the San Francisco Bay Area before matriculating at Cal.

He signed with the Dodgers in 1958, their first year in Los Angeles. After spending the minor league season at Class B Green Bay, he received an eight-game audition that September, including five starts at third base. He played errorless ball, handling 14 chances in the field, and collected three singles in 15 at bats. Robinson then spent both 1959 and 1960 in Triple-A. His contract was sold to the Orioles on December 15, 1960, the last day of the interleague trading period then in force.

Robinson batted .266 with eight home runs in 96 games. He hit .273 in 37 games.

The 1964 season was Robinson's last in the major leagues. He appeared in 170 games played, and collected 113 hits, including 20 doubles, five triples and 12 home runs. He batted .268 with 44 runs batted in. Robinson concluded his pro career after spending 1965 at Triple-A in the Chicago Cubs' organization.

Robinson was inducted to the Cal Athletic Hall of Fame in 1988. He was inducted into the Pac-10 Basketball Hall of Honor in 2010.  Robinson died July 4, 2014 after suffering from congestive heart failure and two heart attacks.

During his years with the Baltimore Orioles, Robinson lived with his wife and two daughters in Castro Valley, California. He was survived by his fifth wife, Wilhelmina Cuenco Robinson, and daughters Michele, Monica and Mia Robinson.

References

External links
 Earl Robinson at SABR (Baseball BioProject)

1936 births
2014 deaths
African-American baseball players
American men's basketball players
Baltimore Orioles players
Baseball players from Louisiana
California Golden Bears baseball players
California Golden Bears men's basketball players
Green Bay Bluejays players
Los Angeles Dodgers players
Major League Baseball outfielders
Montreal Royals players
Rochester Red Wings players
St. Paul Saints (AA) players
Salt Lake City Bees players
Spokane Indians players
Baseball players from Berkeley, California
Basketball players from Berkeley, California
20th-century African-American sportspeople
21st-century African-American people